The Seurbi were a pre-Roman group of tribes living in the north of modern Portugal, in the province of Minho, between the rivers Cávado and Lima (or even reaching the river Minho).

See also
Pre-Roman peoples of the Iberian Peninsula

External links
Detailed map of the Pre-Roman Peoples of Iberia (around 200 BC)

Tribes of Gallaecia
Ancient peoples of Portugal